Bernard F. Cooke was a Democratic member of the Wisconsin State Assembly during the 1876 session. He represented the 4th District of Milwaukee County, Wisconsin. Cooke was born on April 16, 1842 in what is now Milwaukee, Wisconsin.

References

Politicians from Milwaukee
1842 births
Year of death missing
Democratic Party members of the Wisconsin State Assembly